C.A.I. Second S.p.A. was an Italian airline operating flights for its parent company, Alitalia. When Alitalia merged with Air One, it didn't close C.A.I. (at that time known as Volare S.p.A. and then Volareweb.com) so that it could preserve slots at Milan Linate Airport.

It was once a low-cost subsidiary of the old Alitalia-LAI. Its head office was located in Area Tecnica Sud of Terminal 1 of Milan Malpensa Airport, in Ferno, Varese, Italy, and it ceased activity with this name on 12 January 2009. The airline was then used to operate Alitalia flights from Linate Airport as C.A.I. Second. This name was only a legal one and not used in public; all of its flights were branded as Alitalia. The airline ceased operations and was merged into Alitalia mainline by February 2015.

History

Early years
At one time the airline (Volare Group) operated flights from Italy to Spain, Germany, France, Belgium, Poland, the Czech Republic, Estonia, Romania and London Luton Airport. The airline suspended its operations in November 2004 and filed for bankruptcy. The tickets on suspended flights were never refunded to passengers. Since then, the airline exited bankruptcy and, for a period, only operated Italian domestic routes.

By May 2008, Volare flew to 20 destinations in Europe. Volare's charter and leisure subsidiary Air Europe flew to other long-haul destinations. With the fusion of Alitalia-CAI and Air One later on that year, however, Air Europe was discontinued.

New ownership
After bankruptcy, the Volare Group was put up for sale by the Italian Government in December 2004. Alitalia-LAI's offer for 38 million euros was the winning bid, however Air One tried to block the sale by going to court. On 14 April 2006 Volare S.p.A. was founded. On 15 May 2006 the former Volare Group employees were transferred to Volare SpA (the Alitalia subsidiary).

Volare Group had its head office in Thiene, Italy and its commercial management and charter management in Milan. Alitalia's offer for 38 million euros was the winning bid. On 15 May 2006 the former Volare Group employees were transferred to Volare S.p.A. In Italy, the sale of Volare is considered a soap-opera due to the multiple obstacles placed on the sale of the airline to Alitalia-LAI.

As of 1 January 2008, Volareweb was an integral part of Alitalia-LAI and was serving as the company's Italian low-cost subsidiary. Furthermore, due to Alitalia-LAI's hub switch from Milan-Malpensa to Rome-Fiumicino, several flights from Malpensa were discontinued (such as Kraków and Timișoara) and transferred to Volare. With the Alitalia-CAI-Air One fusion, these flights ceased to exist. Nowadays from Milan Malpensa Alitalia-CAI has adopted Air One as a subsidiary for low-fare flights. Only one Airbus A320 coming from parent Alitalia-CAI remained in the fleet (EI-IKB) to preserve the slots.

On 11 February 2015, the airline was dissolved and its operations integrated into Alitalia mainline.

Destinations

Last operations
Volare Airlines code VE was used on some Alitalia flights from Milan Linate Airport (in this way, Alitalia can operate more flights than it would have been able to using a single airline, as there is a limit to the operations at Linate airport for airlines). C.A.I. First was used for the same purpose.

Former destinations
Volareweb.com, the low-cost subsidiary of Alitalia-LAI, served these destinations at the time of closure:

 Helsinki (Helsinki-Vantaa Airport)

 Paris (Paris-Orly Airport)

 Athens (Athens International Airport)

 Alghero (Fertilia Airport)
 Brindisi (Brindisi Airport)
 Cagliari (Cagliari-Elmas Airport)
 Catania (Catania-Fontanarossa Airport)
 Lamezia Terme (Lamezia Terme International Airport)
 Milan (Malpensa International Airport), base
 Pescara (Abruzzo International Airport)
 Venice (Venice Marco Polo Airport)

Niigata

Luqa (Malta International Airport)

Maastricht (Maastricht Aachen Airport)
Rotterdam (Rotterdam Airport)

 Oslo (Oslo Gardermoen Airport)

 Kraków (John Paul II International Airport)
 Łódź (Władysław Reymont Airport)
 Warsaw (Warsaw Frederic Chopin Airport)
 Wrocław (Copernicus Airport)

 Porto (Francisco de Sá Carneiro Airport)

 Timișoara (Traian Vuia International Airport)

 Málaga (Málaga Airport)
 Valencia (Valencia International Airport)

Manchester (Manchester Airport)

Fleet 

Prior to its shutdown in February 2015, the fleet consisted of the following aircraft:

Historical fleet
Volareweb.com operated the following aircraft throughout operations:

31 Airbus A320-200
3 Airbus A321-200
7 Airbus A330-200
2 Boeing 757-200
3 Boeing 767-300
2 McDonnell Douglas MD-83

The last two Volareweb.com A320s were repainted in March 2010 into the Air One livery and are being used alongside three others for Air One's "low fare" model operations.

See also
 List of defunct airlines of Italy

References

External links

 Volare Airlines (archive, 2006–2008)
 Volare Airlines (archive)
 Volare Airlines (archive) 
 Volare Group
 Volare Group (archive) 

1997 establishments in Italy
Alitalia
Defunct airlines of Italy
Defunct European low-cost airlines
Airlines established in 1997
Airlines disestablished in 2009